Mark H. Bernstein (born 1948) is an American philosopher and Joyce & Edward E. Brewer Chair in Applied Ethics at Purdue University. He is known for his research on animal ethics.

Biography
Bernstein received a B.A. in January 1969 in Mathematics from Queens College, City University of New York, a M.A. in June 1975 in Philosophy from California State University, Northridge and a Ph D. in June 1982 in Philosophy from the University of California, Santa Barbara.

Bernstein takes an abolitionist approach to animal rights. In 2015, he authored The Moral Equality of Humans and Animals.

Selected publications

 Fatalism, University of Nebraska Press, 1992
 On Moral Considerability: An Essay On Who Morally Matters, Oxford University Press, 1998
 Without A Tear: Our Tragic Relationship with Animals, University of Illinois Press, 2004
 The Moral Equality of Humans and Animals, Palgrave Macmillan, 2015
 Comparing the Wrongness of Killing Humans and Killing Animals, In The Palgrave Handbook of Practical Animal Ethics, Palgrave Macmillan, 2018

References

External links
 Mark H. Bernstein at Purdue University

1948 births
Living people
21st-century American philosophers
American animal rights scholars
Analytic philosophers
Animal ethicists
Philosophy academics
Purdue University faculty
University of California, Santa Barbara alumni
California State University, Northridge alumni
Queens College, City University of New York alumni